Ryabinnitsy is a rural locality (a village) in Klyazminskoye Rural Settlement, Kovrovsky District, Vladimir Oblast, Russia. The population was 6 as of 2010.

Geography 
Ryabinnitsy is located 34 km east of Kovrov (the district's administrative centre) by road. Sannikovo is the nearest rural locality.

References 

Rural localities in Kovrovsky District